HMS Gore (K481) was a British Captain-class frigate of the Royal Navy in commission during World War II. Originally constructed as the United States Navy Evarts-class destroyer escort USS Herzog (DE-277), she served in the Royal Navy from 1943 to 1946.

Construction and transfer
The ship was ordered on 25 January 1942 and laid down as USS Herzog (DE-277), the first ship of the name, by the Boston Navy Yard in Boston, Massachusetts, on 20 May 1943. She was launched on 8 July 1943. The United States transferred her to the United Kingdom under Lend-Lease on 14 October 1943.

Service history

The ship was commissioned into service in the Royal Navy as HMS Gore (K481) on 14 October 1943 simultaneously with her transfer. She served on patrol and escort duty.

On 29 February 1944, Gore was operating as part of the First Escort Group when she, Affleck, Gould, and the British frigate  detected the German submarine U-358 in the North Atlantic north-northeast of the Azores and began a depth-charge attack which continued through the night and into 1 March 1944, the four frigates dropping a combined 104 depth charges.  Gore and Garlies were forced to withdraw to Gibraltar to refuel on 1 March, but Affleck and Gould continued to attack U-358. During the afternoon of 1 March, U-358 succeeded in torpedoing and sinking Gould at  position , but then was forced to surface after 38 hours submerged and was sunk by gunfire from Affleck at position .

The Royal Navy returned Gore to the U.S. Navy on 2 May 1946.

Disposal
The U.S. Navy sold Gore on either 19 November 1946 or 10 June 1947 (sources vary) for scrapping.

References
  (USS Herzog)
  (HMS Gore)
 Navsource Online: Destroyer Escort Photo Archive Herzog (DE-277)/HMS Gore (K-481)
 uboat.net HMS Gore (K 481)
 Captain Class Frigate Association HMS Gore K481 (DE 277)

External links
 Photo gallery of HMS Gore (K481)

 

Captain-class frigates
Evarts-class destroyer escorts
World War II frigates of the United Kingdom
World War II frigates and destroyer escorts of the United States
Ships built in Boston
1943 ships